Guantanamo: My Journey is the autobiography of David Hicks, an Australian who was held in the US Guantanamo Bay detention camp for five and a half years before eventually pleading guilty to the charge of "material support to terrorism" in a military commission trial. The first 174 pages of the book details his early life, and subsequent standard military training in Kosovo, Pakistan and Afghanistan. The book heavily details Hicks' time spent in Guantanamo Bay prison following his capture in 2001. The book is the first published account by Hicks of his time spent at Guantanamo Bay and the events leading up to his arrest. In August 2011 assets from the book were frozen as the Commonwealth DPP attempted to pursue Hicks through the courts to stop him profiting from the autobiography. The case was dropped in 2012.

Synopsis
The book details Hicks' life to 2010, providing not only vivid details of his imprisonment in Cuba, but provides details for all of Hicks' life. The first half of the book catalogues the events leading up to his arrest in 2001, starting with his early childhood. The second half of the book accounts for Hicks' time in captivity, his trial, and return to Australia.

Praise for the book
Noam Chomsky has praised Hicks' book as "very much worth reading".
Jason Leopold, lead investigative reporter of  Truthout, who landed the first interview with Hicks, described how moved he was by Hicks' book and the torture he endured. The interview was subsequently re-published in The Public Record Other journalists have noted the detailed descriptions of Hicks' torture;
Hicks details guards who punished him for simply studying his legal options. He often asked for medical care to help stress fractures. Little help was given. ‘'You’re not meant to be healthy or comfortable,’’ he was told.
Faeces flooded the cage where Hicks lived and slept, ignored by the American officials. Dirty and unwashed clothes were common. Deafening loud music was pumped into cells to disorientate prisoners. Hicks writes of having to urinate on himself while being shackled during countless hours of interrogation. Detainees on hunger strikes were regularly force-fed.

A review published by a division of Australia's Socialist Alliance stated that the book was an honest account, and expressed outrage at his treatment in the hands of the US military. Any one of our sons, nephews or cousins could have got caught up in this horror story. The brutality of the US army and its violence against supposed enemies is unbelievable. Hicks' accounts are supported by the words of top US army officials as well as by the US political machine, in particular George W. Bush.

Criticism
Upon release, the book was criticised by a few journalists for allegedly failing to express the 'full story,' particularly the details surrounding his training in Afghanistan. Journalist and author Sally Neighbour called the book "deceptive and disappointing". "The problem with Hicks's book is that out of the 456 pages he spends less than one page talking about his training with Al Qaeda. He disguised this as being his first opportunity to speak which of course it's not. He's had many opportunities; dozens or perhaps hundreds of interview requests. I don't think that David Hicks wanted to be questioned. He wanted to put forward his version of events without being questioned. Therefore as a result we have this very self-serving and one-sided and not entirely honest account," she criticised. Journalist Mark Davis suggested that the book was more due to Hicks' experiences in prison, rather than that of deception.  "He doesn't need to be interrogated. If journalists have facts, put them up. He doesn't need to be interrogated," Davis stipulated. "The guy is traumatised. He's also not highly educated. And he's certainly not articulate. He doesn't want to be made mince meat of for the pleasure of a viewing audience. He did five years in virtual solitary confinement. The fact that he's able to string words together at all is a testimony to him."

In response to the criticism, Hicks finally spoke in December 2010 about the book, two months after its release.

In response to claims that he omitted details surrounding his training in Afghanistan, Hicks said:

References

2010 non-fiction books
Australian autobiographies
Memoirs of imprisonment